The 2010 Sanremo Tennis Cup was a professional tennis tournament played on red clay courts. It was part of the 2010 ATP Challenger Tour. It took place in Sanremo, Italy between May 3 and May 9, 2010.

Entrants

Seeds

 Rankings are as of April 26, 2010.

Other entrants
The following players received wildcards into the singles main draw:
  José Acasuso
  Gastón Gaudio
  Alessandro Giannessi
  Marco Sattanino

The following players received entry from the qualifying draw:
  Juan Sebastián Cabal
  Daniele Giorgini
  Nicolas Renavand
  Daniel Smethurst

Champions

Singles

 Gastón Gaudio def.  Martín Vassallo Argüello, 7–5, 6–0

Doubles

 Diego Junqueira /  Martín Vassallo Argüello def.  Carlos Berlocq /  Sebastián Decoud, 2–6, 6–4, [10–8]

External links
Official website
ITF search 

Sanremo Tennis Cup
Sanremo Tennis Cup